European Oppression Live/As Blood Flows is the first compilation/live release by technical death metal band Oppressor. It was released in 1995. It contained five live tracks, one re-recorded track, one cover track and six demo-tracks.

Track listing

†Recorded in Luzern, Switzerland on June 25, 1995.
††Recorded in Saalfield, Germany on June 17, 1995.
†††Recorded in Hengelo, Netherlands on June 9, 1995.
††††Recorded at the Noise Chamber, Rockford, Illinois, USA in May, 1995.
†††††Recorded at Break Through Audio, Chicago, Illinois in November and December 1992.

Personnel
 Adam Zadel - Guitarist
 Tim King - Bassist and Vocals
 Tom Schofield - Drummer
 Jim Stopper - Guitarist

External links
 Oppressor at Encyclopedia Metallum
 
 Oppressor on Myspace

Oppressor compilation albums
1995 compilation albums
1995 live albums